Clwb Ifor Bach (meaning Little Ivor's Club) is a Cardiff nightclub, music venue, Welsh-language club and community centre. It is known to the Cardiff Welsh-speaking community as Clwb and is often known by others on the Cardiff music scene as The Welsh Club.

Clwb Ifor Bach is used as a social centre by Welsh speaking people in Cardiff, as well as by many non-Welsh speakers. Until recent years, the club had a number of regular members only nights. This policy has been discontinued. Clwb Ifor Bach is the focal point for many Welsh-medium organisations and events in the area: social, educational, sporting and otherwise. English and Welsh are spoken equally throughout the club, and most staff are required to be bilingual. No anti-Welsh sentiment is tolerated in the club.

Location 

Clwb Ifor Bach is located in central Cardiff, halfway down Womanby Street, a lane running from the front of Cardiff Castle, parallel to High Street/St Mary Street). The club faces the rear of a Wetherspoons pub, 'The Gatekeeper'.

History 

Clwb Ifor Bach has existed since 1983 and was founded by Cymdeithas Clwb Cymraeg Caerdydd, a society formed with the purpose of establishing a Welsh language social club. The new venue was created inside a former British Legion club on Womanby Street. The chair was Welsh politician Owen John Thomas. The club is named for Ifor Bach, a famous rebel leader against English rule in the 12th century.

In 2017 planning permission was granted to create a Wetherspoons hotel opposite the club and planning permission was also submitted to build six apartments next door. With worries that complaints about noise would threaten Clwb Ifor Bach and The Moon Club's existence, the 'Save Womanby Street' campaign was launched by Thom Bentley and Ewan Moor. Following support from Cardiff Council and the local MP's, plans for the flats were withdrawn in September. The Welsh Government said it would consider new planning laws to protect music venues.

The building 

The club is contained within an unassuming three-storey building. There is a bar, stage and dance floor on each level, varying in size from level to level. The top floor is the largest. The physical fabric of the club underwent a fairly major overhaul in the 1990s.

In early 2019 Clwb Ifor Bach announced plans to take over the derelict site next door to create new 500-capacity and 300-capacity venues. Cardiff Council had acquired the next door site and would lease it to the club. Designs are by architects Nissen Richards Studio.

Events 

There are regular performances of live music on the club's stages. There are also regular themed music nights on a week-to-week basis, during which one of the club's floors may be given over to a particular musical genre for an evening. The range of music played is very wide, and includes reggae, folk, hip-hop, pop, rock, dubstep, drum and bass, house, electro, Welsh and more.

In 2014 the club started holding comedy performances from established stand up and sketch comedians, usually on week nights.

Notable performers
Notable acts and bands who have performed at the venue include:
Napalm Death (1988)
The Strokes
The Killers (2003)
Young Fathers
Super Furry Animals
Wolf Alice
Foals (2007)
Skrillex
Gilles Peterson
Peggy Gou (2017)
Funeral For A Friend (2016)
Saul Williams
Joy Orbison
Gwenno
Coldplay
Stereophonics
Duffy
Manic Street Preachers
Wu Lyf (2011)
Venetian Snares (2005)

References

External links 
Clwb Ifor Bach

Music venues in Cardiff
Nightclubs in Cardiff
Community interest companies
Community interest companies in Wales